Manuel Valencia (c. 1856 – July 6, 1935) was an American painter, and the namesake of Valencia Street in San Francisco, California.

Life
Valencia was born circa 1856 in San Rafael, California. He was trained by Julius Tararnier.

Valencia became a painter in San Francisco, California, where Valencia Street was named in his honor. His painting of Sutter's Fort was hung in the California room of the California State Library. Another painting was acquired by Ida Saxton McKinley, the First Lady of the United States from 1897 to 1901.

Valencia had six sons and three daughters. He died on July 6, 1935, in Sacramento, California.

References

1850s births
1935 deaths
People from San Rafael, California
Artists from San Francisco
American male painters
Painters from California
19th-century American painters
20th-century American painters
20th-century American male artists
19th-century American male artists